Hypericum xylosteifolium is a flowering plant in the St. John's wort family, Hypericaceae. It is the only species in Hypericum sect. Inodora.

Distribution
The species is found in northeast Turkey and southwest Georgia.

Description
The species grows up to 1.5 meters tall. Its petals are golden yellow and its seeds are pale tan.

References

xylosteifolium
Flora of Turkey
Flora of Georgia (country)